Lawrence Wheaton Gates (September 24, 1915December 12, 1996) was an American actor.

His notable roles include H.B. Lewis on daytime's Guiding Light and Doc Baugh in the film version of Cat on a Hot Tin Roof (1958). He played the role of H.B. from 1983 to 1996 and won the Daytime Emmy for Outstanding Supporting Actor at the 1985 awards. (He had previously played the role of District Attorney Eric Van Gelder on Guiding Light in 1977 and 1978.)

Gates may be best remembered for his role in the 1967 film version of In the Heat of the Night, where his character Eric Endicott is part of a famous scene involving him slapping Sidney Poitier's face and getting slapped in return.

Early years
Gates was born in Saint Paul, Minnesota. As a chemical engineering student at the University of Minnesota, he acted in student plays. Some of his early acting experience came at the Barter Theatre in Abingdon, Virginia. His interest in acting led him to change his collegiate focus, and "he ultimately concluded his college career with a speech major".

Career
Gates had a long career in film, television, and theater.  He appeared in the Broadway productions of First Monday in October (1978), The Highest Tree (1959), The Carefree Tree (1955), The Taming of the Shrew (1950), The Teahouse of the August Moon (1953) Bell, Book and Candle (1956) and A Case of Libel (1964). Gates played Polonius opposite Sam Waterston in a New York revival of Hamlet. He starred in the 1976 Broadway play Poor Murderer, which is about an actor who questions whether or not he, who is playing Hamlet, actually killed the actor playing Polonius, or if it was just a dream.

His films included Has Anybody Seen My Gal? (1952), Francis Covers the Big Town (1953), The Girl Rush (1955), Invasion of the Body Snatchers (1956), The Strange One (1957), The Brothers Rico (1957), Some Came Running (1958), Cat on a Hot Tin Roof (1958), The Remarkable Mr. Pennypacker (1959), One Foot in Hell (1960), Underworld U.S.A. (1961), The Young Savages (1961), Ada (1961), Toys in the Attic (1963), Cattle King (1963), The Sand Pebbles (1966), In the Heat of the Night (1967), Hour of the Gun (1967), Death of a Gunfighter (1969), Airport (1970), Lucky Luciano (1973), and Funny Lady (1975).

On television, Gates had numerous roles on such anthology drama series as Philco Television Playhouse, Alfred Hitchcock Presents, The Twilight Zone, Goodyear Television Playhouse, Kraft Television Theatre, Studio One, and Playhouse 90. He continued to make dozens of guest appearances in a wide variety of primetime series, including Bonanza, The F.B.I., Route 66, The Defenders, Rawhide, and Twelve O'Clock High. He played the role of Secretary of State Dean Rusk in the 1974 teleplay The Missiles of October, and played President Herbert Hoover in the 1979 miniseries Backstairs at the White House.

Recognition
In 1964, Gates was nominated for a Tony Award in the category Actor, Supporting or Featured (Dramatic), for his work in A Case of Libel.

Personal life and death
Gates married Tania Wilkof in Huntington, Connecticut, on August 2, 1959. At the time of his death, he was married to Judith Gates. He died on December 12, 1996, in a Sharon, Connecticut, hospital, aged 81.

Filmography

Glory Alley (1952) - Dr. Robert Ardley
Has Anybody Seen My Gal? (1952) - Charles Blaisdell
Above and Beyond (1952) - Capt. William 'Deak' Parsons, USN
Francis Covers the Big Town (1953) - Dan Austin
Take Me to Town (1953) - Marshal Ed Daggett
The Girl Rush (1955) - Hap Halliday
Invasion of the Body Snatchers (1956) - Dr. Dan 'Danny' Kauffman
The Strange One (1957) - Major Avery
Jeanne Eagels (1957) - Al Brooks
The Brothers Rico (1957) - Sid Kubik
Cat on a Hot Tin Roof (1958) - Dr. Baugh
Some Came Running (1958) - Professor Robert Haven French
The Remarkable Mr. Pennypacker (1959) - Rev. Dr. Fielding
One Foot in Hell (1960) - Doc Seltzer
The Great Impostor (1961) - Cardinal
The Hoodlum Priest (1961) - Louis Rosen
Underworld U.S.A. (1961) - John Driscoll
The Young Savages (1961) - Randolph
Ada (1961) - Joe Adams
The Spiral Road (1962) - Dr. Kramer
Cattle King (1963) - President Chester A. Arthur
Toys in the Attic (1963) - Cyrus Warkins
The Sand Pebbles (1966) - Jameson
In the Heat of the Night (1967) - Endicott
Hour of the Gun (1967) - John P. Clum
Death of a Gunfighter (1969) - Mayor Chester Sayre
Airport (1970) - Commissioner Ackerman
Lucky Luciano (1973) - Judge Herlands
Funny Lady (1975) - Bernard Baruch
Leonard Part 6 (1987) - Medusa Guard

References

External links

1915 births
1996 deaths
20th-century American male actors
American male film actors
American male soap opera actors
American male stage actors
American male television actors
Daytime Emmy Award winners
Daytime Emmy Award for Outstanding Supporting Actor in a Drama Series winners
Deaths from cancer in Connecticut
Deaths from leukemia
Male actors from Saint Paul, Minnesota
University of Minnesota alumni
University of Minnesota College of Science and Engineering alumni